Together TV (formerly The Community Channel) is a British free-to-air television channel owned by The Community Channel, a community benefit society. The channel targets a women's audience aged 40 to 60, with programming related to health and wellness, hobbies, and creativity.

The channel was originally launched on 18 September 2000 as The Community Channel with programming focused on promoting volunteerism and charitable organisations. It was initially backed by other British broadcasters who provided resources and other programming to the service. After selling its previous Freeview slot to A&E Networks in 2017, the channel re-launched on Freeview in January 2018 under its current name.

History

1999–2000

In 1999, an initiative by Caroline Diehl  to create Community Channel was supported by Elisabeth Murdoch of BskyB, deputy home secretary Paul Boateng and cabinet office minister Lord Charles Falconer.

Community Channel launched on 18 September 2000 as a national two-hour "ethical shopping channel," which provided charities a platform to showcase their merchandise, raised awareness of the works of national charities and boosted the number of volunteers across the UK.

2002–03

By 2002, Community Channel had increased its broadcast hours from three hours a day to 12 hours a day (8am8pm). It was chosen as one of the initial 30 free-to-view channels on the digital terrestrial platform Freeview. The BBC also agreed to supply relevant programming from the BBC archive to Community Channel.

In conjunction with continued broadcasts of charity focused programming, Community Channel began a co-production with ITV's campaigning series That's Esther to promote volunteering.

2002 also saw Jane Mote, Editor BBC London – TV, Radio and Online – join Community Channel as channel controller.

In 2003 the channel produced First Up, a "cruelty-free" talent show. Milton Keynes ska-punk-funk-metal band Six.Point.Five were awarded first prize by viewers and an expert panel. The prize (in association with Channel 4) was five days' recording in Abbey Road with a producer of their choice (Dave Chang).

2004–05

2004 saw the launch of flagship drama series Kismet Road. Commissioned by the Department of Health, Kismet Road used drama to promote good health. Using a number of Asian actors, writers, trainees and integrating Urdu and Punjabi in the dialogue, Kismet Road was a breakthrough series in showcasing a multicultural Britain.

Community Channel also launched an interactive TV donation service in 2004. This provided a round-the-clock on-air presence for selected charities to encourage donations from viewers. Designed by Sky Interactive, the red button also enabled existing programmes, films or adverts of participating charities to further promote their fundraising campaigns, at no extra cost to the charities.

In 2004, Community Channel moved from an overnight slot on Freeview to a daytime slot.

2005 saw Nick Ware, former Creative Director for BBC Learning, take on the role of channel controller and Community Channel became available on NTL for 24 hours a day.

The documentary Abnormally Funny People broadcast in partnership with Sky and won several awards. It featured a group of gifted stand-up comedians: Tanyalee Davis, Steve Best, Liz Carr, Steve Day, Chris McCausland and Simon Minty. All but one of them is disabled and all are very funny. Abnormally Funny People celebrates its 10th Anniversary at Edinburgh in summer 2015.

In support of The Year of The Volunteer campaign, Community Channel broadcast a range of programmes which highlighted the work of people who donated their time to good causes. Programmes included Beach Lovers and Charity Chic – a magazine show chronicling the lives of those involved in charity shop work.

Programming in July 2005 included Restoration and Soaplife, which featured Fiona Phillips as presenter.

In September, Community Channel and the Royal Horticulture Society produced "Britain in Bloom", a partnership that ran for three years of the RHS Awards, focusing on the Neighbourhood Award scheme, also working with the BBC.

Partnering with Channel Five, Mad 4 Arts was shown in October. Also in October, pairing with BBC, Community Channel aired the National Lottery Awards.

2006

On Thursday 6 July 2006, the Broadcasters Joint Declaration was renewed with new signatories and at an event was held at Channel 4. The signatories were BBC, ITV, Channel Four, Five, Sky, Turner, Flextech Television, Disney, MTV, Discovery, GMTV, ITN and PACT.

Community Channel became available for two more hours on Freeview.

Community Channel was also at the forefront of the interactive TV campaign to raise money for the Indian Tsunami.

Launched to coincide with National Giving Week, Community Channel launched an online social networking area called YourCharitySpace for visitors to blog about charity issues. The site also offers visitors the chance to donate by linking to a specially designed page on the Charities Aid Foundation's website.

2006 saw the launch of Give More, Get More, Volunteer – a campaign to make volunteering more accessible for marginalised groups including people with no formal qualifications, people with disabilities and ethnic minorities.

In January, The Skoll Foundation’s series The New Heroes aired, telling the dramatic stories of 14 daring people from all over the world who are helping bring social reform to poor and marginalized people around the globe.

In August, partnering with BBC Two, Community Channel broadcast Restoration Village, followed by North By North East in September.

In October, the channel broadcast the Screen Nation Film and Television Awards, recognising talented black and ethnic minority actors. Teaming up with Channel Five, Mad For Poetry was also broadcast in October, along with Saving a Stranger by Anthony Nolan.

In November, Ballet Saved My Life was broadcast as a partnership with Channel 4.

In December, teaming up with Channel 4, the Community Channel aired the Beacon Awards/Secret Millionaire and Oxfam.

2007–08

Community Channel launched an interactive initiative for young film-makers called Charge TV and described as "YouTube with a conscience". Charge TV ran for five series broadcasting on Community Channel and on the website.

Daren Forsyth of BBC Future Media, became the channel’s Director of Innovation & New Media. Forsyth led a programme of digital media initiatives across Media Trust's media training, news distribution, film and TV productions and Community Channel, the TV and online service for charities.

In 2007, Community Channel joined forces with The Scout Association to deliver the live broadcast from Brownsea Island of the Sunrise Ceremony to mark the 100th anniversary of the movement.

In February, the channel aired James McAvoy: On the Tiger’s Trail, which featured the Scottish actor and explains the work of RETRAK's flagship project in Uganda.

In June 2007, the Giving Nation Challenge documentary aired which was filmed in schools across the UK showcasing young entrepreneurs participating in the Giving Nation Challenge, including their progress, and pitches to experts.

July 2007 saw ‘'Cutie HQ'’, produced by Hamma & Glamma that had replaced the axed ‘'CharliiTV'’ strand that ran from February 2006-June 2007, which was produced by RDF Television (the rights are now owned by Shout Factory in the US). It was narrated by Hannah Sandling with the tutions provided by Lily Vincent, Toni Micklebrough, Samanie Warren, Danielle Chapman, Desiree Skylark, Luciana Caporaso & Jessica Reid. ‘'Cutie HQ'’ ended in December 2008.

Community Channel also broadcast Summit About A Boy, following 22-year-old Lee McConville's extraordinary journey from the violent gang-ridden streets of Lozells in Birmingham to the exclusive briefings at the G8 summit in Germany, under the wing of veteran Times political editor Philip Webster.

In 2008, Community Channel’s Awareness Campaign featured focused programming for a variety of campaigns including Disability Week, World Mental Health Day, Black History Month, Aids and Human Rights Day.

2009–10
Community Channel launched its new BSL Zone (British Sign Language Zone) on 21 January 2009. This initiative offers an extended service in signing supported programmes.

Following on from their 2007 success, Community Channel joined forces with The Scout Association once again to showcase their six-part series Scout TV.

Spotting Cancer Early, a four-part series produced with Cancer Research UK, broadcast with Dr. Sarah Jarvis and Dr. Chris Steele presenting.

In 2010, Community Channel partnered with BT Vision and was available on Freeview for 24 hours a day from the month of May to June, leading to a notable spike in viewing figures.
 
In September 2010, Community Channel celebrated a decade of broadcasting. For the anniversary month in September, programmes including Inspiring Stories, How the Other Half Live, Living With Size Zero and other Sky health series were broadcast. Other seasons in 2010 included Alzheimers Awareness, Black History Month, Disability Week in December and programming for World AIDS Day.

Community Channel also launched Community Champions in partnership with Heavenly. This campaign aimed to recognise the individual champions in communities across the UK. The public were encouraged to nominate and vote for their own community champions. In addition, a dedicated telephone line enabled entry forms to be requested. The top 20 people with the highest number of registered votes were shortlisted and an independent judging panel then decided on the winning five. The five winners were recognised through a documentary that highlighted the impact that they make in their community.

Community Channel also partnered with Looking Local for interactive services on Sky.

October 2010 saw the celebration of Black History Month on Community Channel. Programmes included Black History and Me, Girl Guiding Anniversary, Future Shorts, Penny Revolution and Evicted.

In November 2010, Community Channel took a deeper look at deprivation during Poverty Month, with programmes including The Street: Film with the Homeless and SPIT: Squeegee Punks in Traffic. The Nick Broomfield Season, the Strictly Politics documentary, and Unicef and Children in Need weeks were also popular with audiences during this month too.

2011

Community Channel opened 2011 with a campaign to increase cancer awareness and promote healthy living. Your Sport returned for a fourth series following its broadcast as shorts on Channel 5 from October 2010. An environmental season in March included Nature Inc, Planet India, Explore and The Environmental Atlas of Europe. International Women’s Day was highlighted through the series Make Women Matter and other programming.

Other notable spring and summer premieres included the Oscar-winning Blood of Yinzhou District, MediaBox, Talent Studio, Untold Stories, The Team (produced by Search For Common Ground), ViewChange, Charity Champions (from BBC Children in Need) and That Paralympic Show (from Channel Four).

London360 launched in June 2011, a series celebrating the capital’s communities through features produced by young reporters trained in journalism, production and digital skills. The "Riot Special" following the 2011 England riots received critical praise for its unique look into the London riots. London360 has broadcast five series and featured hundreds of communities to date with media partners including BBC Radio London, The Voice, MTV, Sky, Time Out, Huffington Post and Westside Radio. Many of London360s alumni have gone on to work for major broadcasters including BBC, ITV, MTV and London Live.

In August and September, the channel ran a season of pioneering British films under the This Britain banner. These films were funded by the BFI Production Board and charted changing Britain from the 1970s to the millennium. The season ran for 10 weeks, launching with Horace Ové's Pressure (1975), and included Karl Francis's Above Them The Earth (1977), Peter K. Smith’s A Private Enterprise (1974), Ron Peck’s Nighthawks (1978), Sally Potter’s The Gold Diggers (1983), Menelik Shabazz's Burning an Illusion (1981) Patrick Keiller's Robinson in Space (1997), Margaret Tait’s Blue Black Permanent (1992), and John Akomfrah's Speak Like A Child (1998).

In September, the channel launched a simulcast programming block on Channel M, a local TV channel in Manchester, broadcasting four hours a day. This continued until Channel M’s closure in April 2012. The channel also launched feature documentary strand Beyond Borders, which has broadcast more than 50 films to date.

In October, the channel ran a season marking Black History Month and in November it ran a season of programmes on addiction, including HBO’s High on Crack Street, its premiere coinciding with Sky’s premiere of The Fighter, which features the documentary.

In November, the channel launched UK360, a celebrity-presented series that featured stories from communities and local reporters across the UK. It ran for 50 episodes until August 2013 and presenters included Benjamin Zephaniah, Terry Wogan, Rachel Riley, Matt Allwright, Charlie Dimmock, Adam Deacon and many more. The channel also ran a short event supporting the Film Africa film festival and lifelong learning content.

In December, the channel broadcast eight Worldview-supported international documentaries as new films commissioned by Worldview, Community Channel and YourWorldview shorts. Other new programmes included An Inconvenient Truth 2 and Dream Islands.

2012

In March, Community Channel and The Sunday Times launched "The Change Makers", a competition calling on the public to nominate inspirational people that had made positive impact on the community. Six features appeared in newspaper including interviews with celebrity supporters James Middleton and Karren Brady. Over 20 social enterprises were showcased in the campaign and the winning group Street Soccer in Scotland received exposure for their work across The Sunday Times and Community Channel, a £500 prize and a raft of professional media support from The Sunday Times to help further promote their work.

Community Channel was broadcast partner for The Space, a new digital arts service from Arts Council England and the BBC. From July to 16 October, specially-produced programmes were aired and featured content from companies and artists, from films on John Peel, Tracey Emin and Ridley Scott alongside full performances of The Two Worlds of Charlie F (performed by Afghan war veterans) and two Globe To Globe Shakespeare’s (performed by companies from Zimbabwe and Bangladesh). A specially-commissioned Community Channel series Arts360 brought mainstream and community arts to life from a younger perspective.

Sleep Out Live was Community Channel’s first live broadcast event. Partnering with Centrepoint and six other youth homeless charities, it contained interviews, performances, guest appearances, link-ups across the UK and films about youth homelessness. The promo featuring presenter Richard Madeley was broadcast to shopping centres across the UK with footfall of 60m people and was secured Sky cross-promotion on Sky News and PickTV, who broadcast it 46 times. The event raised £350,000, up £100,000 on the previous year’s total.

During the London Olympics, Community Channel documented the lives and passions of disparate groups and communities that can be viewed as being outside the social norm in the Outsiders season. Programming included A Very British Games, Gypsy Gentleman, For the Love of Odd, Thank You Skinhead Girl and UK360: Momentum.

In November, Community Channel launched as a third-party linking partner on BBC iPlayer. This enables BBC iPlayer’s 8,000,000 weekly users to find information and over 1000 on-demand programmes from Community Channel on the UK’s leading broadcaster VOD service.

2013

In February, the channel’s Freeview hours were extended by three hours from 5am8am to 2am8am.

In April, Community Channel showcased an Against All Odds season to celebrate those who have overcome mental or physical setbacks. This coincided with National Autism Month and Cystic Fibrosis Week (29th – 5th).

May and June saw Community Channel introduce the popular Gypsy Roma Traveller season in which Gypsy Roma Traveller (GRT) cultures and histories throughout the UK were celebrated with online features and links to groups. Steering Group of 20 GRT activists, academics and artists identified issues to profile, e.g. housing, health, education, women, art and prejudice.

The channel secured over 20 new films and documentaries for the season, working with NGOs, broadcasters, distributors and filmmakers around the world. A UK360 special featuring GRT360 news bulletins, talking head promos and agony aunt spots added context to the season.

Community Channel received extensive online support with a dedicated microsite for highlights, news, topics and ways to take action. Newsletters were sent to over 20k subscribers to increase awareness.

The season gained coverage in several newspapers, magazines and websites including The Independent, Huffington Post and New Statesman.

In September, a new series of Brilliant Britain began piloting. Brilliant Britain is an entertainment magazine show that is produced by Community Channel and celebrates brilliant community stories from across the UK, featuring regular segments and local stories.

Community Channel became available on Freesat channel 651 in 2013, and on TVCatchup.

2014

In 2014, Community Channel moved its Freeview EPG slot from news (channel 87) to general entertainment (channel 63).

Community Channel and Media Trust gained funding from the Big Lottery Fund to launch the flagship campaign "Do Something Brilliant". This campaign sets out to celebrate all that is brilliant about the incredible, diverse and talented people who make England, Scotland, Wales and Northern Ireland a better place for us all.

Do Something Brilliant launched on 25 February 2014. In conjunction with this, Brilliant Britain and My Brilliant Moment will showcase communities and charities around the UK.

Community Channel launched on Freeview HD on 18 March and was to be found on channel 109.

The Easy Riders launched on 19 March 2014. The Easy Riders is a new 10-part series starring Red Dwarf star Danny John-Jules and Steve Keys. Sharing a passion for motorcycles and adventure, we follow our intrepid explorers as they embark on an epic 1,250 mile journey from the UK to Valencia in aid of Riders for Health; a charity working to ensure health workers in Africa can access reliable transportation to reach isolated people with regular healthcare.

On 29 April 2014, Community Channel had its broadcast hours extended on Freeview SD from 3am8am to 3am12am.
April also saw the channel introduce its Secrets of Sex strand. Covering issues surrounding gay rights, sex and disability, body image, AIDS and the fight against female genital mutilation, this strand aims to lift the lid on aspects of sex and sexuality rarely covered in the media. Shows including Naked on the Inside, Protection, The Last Taboo and the Meryl Streep-narrated Cutting Tradition have featured in this strand. Secrets of Sex has grown to become a channel staple and has seen audience figures in the hundreds of thousands.

Community Channel’s young reporter series London360 ran for 13 episodes on new local TV channel London Live.

In August, Community Channel’s Do Something Brilliant campaign teamed up with The Sunday Times to launch The Change Makers, a search for the UK’s social innovator of the year. Run in association with SparkNews Impact Journalism Day, this competition aimed to inspire people across the country to do something brilliant and to spark social change. Out of more than one hundred nominations, Joe Dickinson won the competition making him the social innovator of the year. Joe’s Call and Check service ensures that postmen and women check in on vulnerable people in Jersey.

On 16 September 2014, Community Channel’s Freeview hours extended once again to 17 hours on air including 3am3pm and 7pmmidnight. As well as achieving a month’s viewing figures over 2 million, September also saw the highest rated week in channel history with more than a million viewers.

2015

On 22 February 2015, Community Channel premiered its first ever drama series PREMature. The series was acquired in 2014 and was originally funded through Kickstarter along with co-production funding from Community Channel. Cast and crew screenings of all six episodes were held in Brentford on the eve of its television premiere. Easy Riders returned for a third series with The Five Peaks challenge. Planet Norfolk returned for series 2, with the filmmaker Nik Coleman holding a premiere screening in Great Yarmouth and a promotion being shown at Norwich FC's grounds. London360 returned for series 7, with its reporters interviewing party leaders ahead of the election for Sky's Stand Up and Be Counted.

In March 2015, The Community Channel moved to a Freeview HD multiplex on channel 109 in order to facilitate the launch of Horror Channel.

In April the channel launched Make #Something Brilliant competition with Wendy Turner Webster and Julie Peasgood, with support from Hobbycraft and Craft Beautiful magazine. This was alongside a craft and passions season on the channel which included series Crafty Beggars and She's Crafty.

Do Something Brilliant Week launched in late May, with a new TV ad broadcasting across Sky, MTV, Turner and BT Sport alongside Community Channel. The Share #Something Brilliant competition was supported by METRO and other media and charity partners supported the campaign through online and social media. New programming for Do Something Brilliant Week included the five-part series This Is Brilliant and hour-long Do Something Brilliant, alongside regular series My Brilliant Moment and Brilliant Northern Ireland. Other series included Supersize vs. Superskinny, The Undateables and The Day Before Tomorrow from The Drum.

2016

In January, the channel was the first broadcaster to show the series Walks Around Britain, which was commissioned from the Yorkshire-based Nova Productions.  Community Channel premiered both season one and two, and screened season three after it was first broadcast on the Made TV network of local channels.

In 2016, the channel launched a crowdfunding campaign to help raise £300,000 to keep the channel broadcasting. The channel offered ownership shares for £50 or more. The campaign raised  £367,200 in 47 days – over £67,000 more than their original target.

In September 2016 the Community Channel became a Community Benefit Society (FCA: RS007400), and issued shares to its 200+ new owners, and then ran director elections to elect three members to its board. The new CBS board met for the first time in November, and included the elected directors alongside media industry and charity directors. The Community Channel's charitable status was recognised by HMRC in November 2016.

 Rebranding and relaunch 
In mid-2017, the channel's broadcast licence was transferred to TCC Broadcasting Limited (a for-profit entity based at the same address as The Community Channel and registered May 2017) which reduced its broadcasting hours to 14 hours per day. In August, the channel ceased broadcasting on Freeview, and TCC Broadcasting Limited was sold to A&E Networks UK, with the transaction used to allow a relocation of A&E's Blaze to channel 63. In January 2018, it was announced that Community Channel would relaunch as Together''' on 16 January 2018 on Freeview channel 93, with Together TV+1 taking this channel number in July 2019 when the main channel moved to Freeview 89 after a slight re-brand and change in multiplex, making it available in most UK homes. As part of a Freeview channel reshuffle on 20 November 2019, Together TV moved from Freeview 89 to Freeview 88, and Together TV+1 took Freeview 89, later moving to channel 82. Together TV+1 ended transmissions via Freeview on 15 February 2021.

 2022 

In March 2022 the channel launched the second year of its Diverse Film Fund, following the launch of the fund in 2021, which supported five short documentaries under the "Black British and Breaking Boundaries" banner – of these "Our Land" won a BAFTA for Best Short Form Programme in May 2022.

The channel's successful Sunflower Challenge behaviour change campaign returned for a second year, with over fifty thousand people and 100+ community groups receiving sunflower seed kits and support over a 12-week growing journey to improve mental health and community participation. Over 130,000 people and 500 community groups had taken part in similar Challenges since spring 2021.

On 29 June 2022, the channel changed to being broadcast on Freeview as a HbbTV service as the multiplex it was on (COM7) was closed down. For viewers whose television sets support the technology, by having Freeview Play for example, it means they can watch the channel 24 hours a day. For viewers whose television sets do not support any HbbTV services, then the channel will continue to be broadcast for four hours on Freeview as a standard channel, between the hours of 3am and 7am.

On 26 October 2022, this 24 hour HbbTV channel became Together+1 on Freeview channel 92 (COM5) as The Community Channel society managed to get a COM4 slot for a temporary period for their Together TV service, starting 26 October 2022 on channel 83 and running from 5am to 3am each day.

Current programmingAde in Britain (formally on ITV)An OutageBattersea Junction – Stories from the Winstanley and York Road Estates (a documentary put together by Wandsworth Heritage Service and Year 6 children from Falconbrook Primary School).https://www.togethertv.com/battersea-junction-3https://www.digital-works.co.uk/battersea/index.htmlBrewing StoriesGarden Rescue (formally on BBC One)https://www.bbc.co.uk/iplayer/episode/m001bg1f/garden-rescue-series-7-35-stockportThe Last Miners Yorkshire's Worst Mining Disaster'' (the story of the Oaks Colliery Disaster of 1866)

References

External links
 

Television channels in the United Kingdom
Television channels and stations established in 2000
2000 establishments in the United Kingdom